Dipropyl ether is the symmetrical ether of two n-propyl groups. It is a colorless, flammable liquid with a sweet odor typical of ethers.

Preparation

Acid catalyzed ether synthesis

Dipropyl ether can be synthesized by reacting two molecules of n-propanol in the presence of p-toluenesulfonic acid (a strong acid) and heat, in the same way other symmetrical ethers may be formed.

Williamson ether synthesis

This ether may also be prepared by way of the Williamson ether synthesis in which n-propoxide, the conjugate base of n-propanol, is reacted with an n-propyl halide:

Safety

As is typical of ethers, dipropyl ether may slowly form explosive organic peroxides over long periods in storage. Antioxidants such as butylated hydroxytoluene are often added to ethers to prevent this process.

Due to the shock and light sensitive nature of organic peroxides, dipropyl ether should never be boiled or evaporated to dryness. This concentrates peroxides that may be present, which can then detonate unexpectedly destroying the vessel in which they have deposited or igniting nearby flammable liquids.

See also
 Diisopropyl ether

References

Dialkyl ethers
Symmetrical ethers
Sweet-smelling chemicals